Roopal Tyagi (born 6 October 1989) is an Indian choreographer, and television actor. She is known for playing Gunjan in the popular Zee TV show Sapne Suhane Ladakpan Ke. She later participated in dance reality show Jhalak Dikhhla Jaa 8 and Bigg Boss 9 in 2015.

Early life 
Tyagi was born on October 6, 1989 in Bangalore, India. She has done her education at Sophia High School, Bangalore. She trained at Shiamak Davar's dance institute Bangalore, her hometown, after which she got an opportunity to assist Pony Verma, a Bollywood choreographer in the song "Mere Dholna" from the movie Bhool Bhulaiyaa. For two years, she shuttled between Bangalore and Mumbai before she finally settled in Mumbai.

Career 
Roopal started her career as a choreographer in 2007. After starting her acting career with the role of Mansha in Hamari Betiyoon Ka Vivaah, she appeared in Ek Nayi Chhoti Si Zindagi. She also appeared in the Zee TV show Kasamh Se starring Prachi Desai and Ram Kapoor. The show was produced by Ekta Kapoor and Balaji Telefilms.

She played Gunjan in the Indian soap opera Sapne Suhane Ladakpan Ke. Roopal participated in the eighth season of Jhalak Dikhhla Jaa as a wildcard entrant but was eliminated after a week. She was a contestant in Bigg Boss 9, in which she was paired up with Digangana Suryavanshi and was eliminated in the second week of voting.

In 2012, Tyagi won two Zee Rishtey Awards for Favourite Behen as Gunjan and Rachana (Mahima Makwana), and Favourite Nayi Jodi as Gunjan and Mayank (Ankit Gera). In 2013, she was nominated in the Indian Telly Awards for Fresh New Face as Gunjan.

Tyagi wrote an open letter to her Instagram in 2020, where she criticized the Indian contingent for undermining the main female character and the "backwardness" of the series.  "You think you are making a drama about a 'black' skin girl, a 'short' girl, a 'fat' girl, etc. and the problem they are having, and calling it a progressive show. No" she said to the producers.

Television

Filmography 
2007: Bhool Bhulaiya – Mere Dolna

Awards

References

External links 

 
 

Living people
1989 births
Actresses from Bangalore
Actresses in Kannada television
Indian soap opera actresses
21st-century Indian actresses
Indian television actresses
Actresses in Hindi television
Bigg Boss (Hindi TV series) contestants